Antonio Ricciulli (1615–1660) was a Roman Catholic prelate who served as Bishop of Umbriatico (1659–1660).

Biography
Antonio Ricciulli was born in 1615 in Rugliano, Italy.
On 9 Jun 1659, he was appointed during the papacy of Pope Alexander VII as Bishop of Umbriatico.
On 15 Jun 1659, he was consecrated bishop by Francesco Maria Brancaccio, Cardinal-Priest of Santi XII Apostoli, with Stefano Quaranta, Archbishop of Amalfi, and Persio Caracci, Bishop Emeritus of Larino, serving as co-consecrators. 
He served as Bishop of Umbriatico until his death in Aug 1660.

References

External links and additional sources
 (for Chronology of Bishops) 
 (for Chronology of Bishops) 

17th-century Italian Roman Catholic bishops
Bishops appointed by Pope Alexander VII
1615 births
1660 deaths